Pacita Wiedel (born 31 March 1933) is a Canadian fencer. She competed in the women's individual foil event at the 1964 Summer Olympics.

References

External links
 

1933 births
Living people
Canadian female fencers
Olympic fencers of Canada
Fencers at the 1964 Summer Olympics
Commonwealth Games medallists in fencing
Commonwealth Games bronze medallists for Canada
Pan American Games medalists in fencing
Pan American Games bronze medalists for Canada
Fencers at the 1967 Pan American Games
Fencers at the 1970 British Commonwealth Games
Medallists at the 1970 British Commonwealth Games